Juan Daniel Galeano (born 3 July 1989) is an Argentine professional footballer currently playing for Atlanta.

References

 
 

1989 births
Living people
Argentine footballers
Argentine expatriate footballers
Association football midfielders
Club Atlético Atlanta footballers
Cobresal footballers
Club Atlético Sarmiento footballers
San Martín de San Juan footballers
San Martín de Tucumán footballers
Aldosivi footballers
Central Córdoba de Santiago del Estero footballers
Argentine Primera División players
Primera Nacional players
Primera B Metropolitana players
Chilean Primera División players
Expatriate footballers in Chile
Argentine expatriate sportspeople in Chile
Footballers from Buenos Aires